John Pym (20 May 1584 - 8 December 1643) was a politician and administrator from London, generally seen as one of the founders of Parliamentary democracy in England. One of the Five Members whose attempted arrest in January 1642 sparked the First English Civil War, his use of procedure to outmanoeuvre opponents was unusual for the period and he was respected by contemporaries rather than admired. In 1895, the political historian Goldwin Smith described him as "the greatest member of Parliament that ever lived".

His father died when he was seven months old, and Pym was brought up by his stepfather Sir Anthony Rous, inheriting his Puritan views and deep opposition to the reforms of Archbishop William Laud. He was also a leading member of the Providence Island Company, an attempt to establish a Puritan colony in Central America.

Described as 'a true revolutionary', he led the opposition to arbitrary rule under first James I, then Charles I. His leadership in the early stages of the war was essential to the Parliamentarian cause, particularly his role in negotiating the Solemn League and Covenant with the Scots Covenanters; his death from cancer in December 1643 was seen as a major blow.

Originally buried in Westminster Abbey,  after the Stuart Restoration in 1660, his body was dumped in a pit at nearby St Margaret's, Westminster along with those of other Parliamentary leaders. Although his reputation later suffered in comparison to less complex figures like John Hampden and Viscount Falkland, he is now viewed as an astute politician and effective speaker, whose ideas and language were adapted by Patriots during the American Revolution and 19th-century American liberals.

Personal details
His father Alexander Pym (1547–1585) was a member of the minor gentry, from Brymore, Somerset, who became a successful lawyer in London, where John was born in 1584. Alexander died seven months later and his mother, Philippa Colles (died 1620), married a wealthy Cornish landowner, Sir Anthony Rous. A close friend and executor of Sir Francis Drake, Sir Anthony instilled in his stepson a strong dislike of Spain, a zealous belief in Puritanism and opposition to both the Catholic Church, and the rival Protestant theology of Arminianism.

The Rous were a large and close-knit family, who often wed relatives and friends. In May 1604, Pym married Anne Hooke, a daughter of Barbara Rous and John Hooke, and aunt of the scientist Robert Hooke. Before her death in 1620, they had seven children, of whom four survived into adulthood; Philippa (1604–1654), Charles (1615–1671), Dorothy (1617–1661), and Catherine.

Career
Pym was educated at Pembroke College, Oxford, then known as Broadgates and famous for 'advanced Protestantism'. Since legal knowledge was considered part of an education, he subsequently attended the Middle Temple in 1602; while he does not appear to have formally graduated from either, he made a number of lifelong friends, the most important being William Whitaker.

In June 1605, he was appointed collector of taxes for the Exchequer in Hampshire, Gloucestershire, and Wiltshire; this gave him a broader range of connections than many contemporaries, who were often confined to family or county networks. Whitaker's father had been Member of Parliament for Westbury, Wiltshire, and in 1621, Pym was elected for the nearby seat of Calne.

Forced Loan and Petition of Right

Pym's diary shows he viewed Parliamentary legislation as a whole, not just issues of interest to himself; combined with an ability to explain them clearly, it led to his appointment to numerous committees. Since direct criticism of the king was considered treason, the only way to express opposition was by attacking his advisors, using the process of impeachment. Pym argued it was for the Commons to decide guilt or innocence, leaving the Lords only to determine the penalty; this would become significant in his future Parliamentary career.

Even in an era when it was common, he was notable for his anti-Catholicism, and opposition to alleged Catholic practices in the Church of England. One reason for this belief were the close links in the 17th-century between religion and politics, with alterations in one viewed as implying alterations in the other. Many contemporaries fought in the Thirty Years War and were concerned at the apparent failure of James to defend his own son-in-law and Protestant Europe as a whole.

After the dissolution of Parliament in 1621, Pym was arrested, and brought before the Privy Council, but released in August 1622. In 1624, he was elected for Tavistock, a seat controlled by Earl of Bedford, which he retained for the rest of his career. He was one of the prime movers behind an attempt to impeach the Duke of Buckingham in 1626, an action that led to Parliament being dissolved. Only Buckingham's assassination in August 1628 prevented a second attempt, while Pym supported the presentation of the Petition of Right to Charles I in 1628.

Pym, his stepbrother Francis Rous, and John Hampden, also led the Parliamentary attack on Roger Maynwaring and Robert Sibthorpe, two clergymen who published sermons supporting the Caroline precepts of the divine right of kings, and passive obedience. Although censured by Parliament for preaching against the established English constitution, Charles pardoned them, and dissolved Parliament, initiating the period of Personal Rule that continued until 1640.

Pym became treasurer of the Providence Island Company in 1630, a role that increasingly consumed his time, and he relinquished his Exchequer position in 1639. Participation in the colonial movement was common among Puritan leaders, while company meetings later provided cover for co-ordinating political opposition. Many of these became leaders of the Parliamentary opposition in 1642, among them Hampden, Rous, Henry Darley, Lord Saye, William Waller, and Lord Brooke.

Leader of the opposition; 1640 to 1641

Following defeat in the first of the Bishops Wars, Charles recalled Parliament in April 1640; when the Short Parliament refused to vote taxes without concessions, he dissolved it after only three weeks. However, the humiliating terms of the Treaty of Ripon imposed by the Scots after a second defeat forced him to hold fresh elections in November; Pym became unofficial leader of the opposition. Historians like Tim Harris argue that with the exception of a few extremists, by 1640 there was general consensus attempts to rule without Parliament had gone too far. This changed after the Grand Remonstrance in November 1641, when constitutional monarchists like Clarendon switched sides, arguing Parliament now wanted too much.

Where Pym differed from Clarendon, and many of his own colleagues, was understanding Charles would not keep his commitments. Even while negotiating with Parliamentary moderates, he and Henrietta Maria openly told foreign ambassadors any concessions were temporary, and would be retrieved by force if needed. These suspicions were enhanced after October 1641, when Irish Catholic rebels claimed his approval for their actions, an assertion given weight by previous attempts to use Irish troops against his Scottish opponents, and initial refusal to condemn the rebellion.

However, Pym was hampered by the fact Charles was essential to a stable government and society. Regardless of religion or political belief, in 1642 the vast majority believed a 'well-ordered' monarchy was divinely mandated; where they disagreed was what 'well-ordered' meant, and who held ultimate authority in clerical affairs. Royalists generally supported a Church of England governed by bishops, appointed by, and answerable to, the king; Parliamentarians believed he was answerable to the leaders of the church, appointed by their congregations.

Puritan was a term for anyone who wanted to reform, or 'purify', the Church of England, and contained many different sects. Presbyterians were the most prominent, and included leaders like Pym and John Hampden, but there were many others, such as Congregationalists, often grouped together as Independents. Close links between religion and politics added further complexity; one reason for opposition to bishops was their presence in the House of Lords, where they often blocked Parliamentary legislation. Their removal by the Clergy Act 1640 was a major step along the road to war.

Most Presbyterians were political conservatives, who believed in a limited electorate, and wanted to keep the Church of England, but as a reformed, Presbyterian body, similar to the Church of Scotland. 1640 England was a structured, socially conservative, and largely peaceful society; the devastation caused by the Thirty Years War in Europe meant many wanted to avoid war at any cost.

Road to war; 1641 to 1643
Shortly after the Long Parliament assembled, it was presented with the Root and Branch petition; signed by 15,000 Londoners, it demanded England follow the Scots, and expel bishops. This reflected widespread concerns about 'Catholic practices', or Arminianism in the Church of England, given weight by Charles' apparent willingness to make war on the Protestant Scots, but not assist his nephew Charles Louis regain his hereditary lands. Many feared Charles was about to sign an alliance with Spain, a view shared by experienced diplomatic observers like Venice, and even France.

This meant ending Charles' arbitrary rule was not only important for England, but the Protestant cause in general. Since respect for the institution of monarchy prevented direct attacks on Charles, the traditional route was to prosecute his 'evil counsellors.' Doing so made it clear that although the king was above the law, his subordinates were not, and he could not protect them; the intention was to make others think twice about their actions. Archbishop William Laud was impeached in December 1640 and held in the Tower of London until his execution in 1645; Strafford, former Lord Deputy of Ireland and organiser of the 1640 Bishops War, was attainted and executed in May 1641.

The Commons also passed a series of constitutional reforms, including the Triennial Acts, abolition of the Star Chamber, and an end to levying taxes without Parliament's consent. Voting as a block, the bishops ensured all these were rejected by the Lords. In June 1641, Pym secured passage of the Clergy Act in the Commons; one of its key provisions was to remove bishops from the Lords, which therefore rejected it. The growing political tension was brought to head in October with the outbreak of the Irish Rebellion. both Charles and Parliament supported raising troops to suppress it, but neither trusted the other with their control, fearing any army would be used against them first.

Pym helped draft the Grand Remonstrance, presented to Charles on 1 December 1641; unrest culminated in 23 to 29 December with widespread riots in Westminster, led by the London apprentices. Suggestions Pym and other Parliamentary leaders helped organise these have not been proved, but as a result, bishops stopped attending the Lords. On 30 December, John Williams, Archbishop of York and eleven other bishops, signed a complaint, disputing the legality of any laws passed by the Lords during their exclusion. Viewed by the Commons as inviting Charles to dissolve Parliament, all twelve were imprisoned for treason.

In response to the growing unrest, on 4 January Charles made an unsuccessful attempt to arrest the Five Members, one of whom was Pym. Having failed to do so, he left London accompanied by many Royalist MPs and his supporters in the Lords, a major tactical mistake as it gave the opposition majorities in both houses. When the First English Civil War began in August, Pym headed the Committee of Safety; his reputation for integrity and ability to keep a diverse coalition of interests together was crucial to surviving the first 18 months of the conflict.

By early August 1643, a series of Royalist victories combined with the death of the popular John Hampden in June meant the Parliamentarian cause seemed close to collapse. At this crucial point, it was saved by Pym's leadership and determination, which led to a renewed commitment to win the war. He created the foundations of victory by ensuring Parliament had sufficient financial and military resources, one of his last acts being to negotiate the Solemn League and Covenant that secured Scottish support.

He died, probably of cancer, at Derby House on 8 December 1643; Parliament agreed to pay off the debts he incurred as a result of neglecting his private business interests, although they were still being disputed in 1665. Buried in Westminster Abbey, his remains were exhumed after the Stuart Restoration in 1660 and re-buried in a common pit at St Margaret's, Westminster.

His chief opponent, the Earl of Clarendon, a senior advisor to Charles during the First English Civil War, later wrote; 'he had a very comely and grave way of expressing himself...and understood the temper and affections of the kingdom as well as any man’. Pym's reputation suffered in comparison to less complex figures like Hampden and Viscount Falkland, especially during the Victorian era which romanticised the Royalist cause. One exception was the historian Goldwin Smith, who described him as "the greatest member of Parliament that ever lived". He is now generally viewed as an astute politician who laid the foundations of modern Parliamentary democracy and effective speaker, whose ideas and language were adapted by Patriots during the American Revolution and 19th century American liberals.

Footnotes

References

Sources

Bibliography
 
 
 
 
 

 
 

Lay members of the Westminster Assembly
Alumni of Broadgates Hall, Oxford
People from Sedgemoor (district)
Roundheads
Five Members
1584 births
1643 deaths
Members of the Middle Temple
Burials at St Margaret's, Westminster
English MPs 1621–1622
English MPs 1624–1625
English MPs 1625
English MPs 1626
English MPs 1628–1629
English MPs 1640 (April)
English MPs 1640–1648
Members of the Parliament of England for Tavistock